Fuxan Os Ventos is a modern Galician folk music group. They sing in Galician, the language of Galicia.

Discography

Studio albums 
Fuxan Os Ventos (1976)
O Tequeletequele (1977)
Galicia Canta Ó Neno (1978)
Sementeira (1978)
Quen A Soubera Cantar (1981)
Noutrora (1984)
Sempre E Máis Despois (1999)
Na Memoria Dos Tempos (2002)

Singles 
 Galicia (2016)
 Lúa De Prata (2018)

See also
 Galician traditional music

Galician musical groups
Spanish folk music groups
Galician traditional music groups